CPU-Z is a freeware system profiling and monitoring application for Microsoft Windows and Android that detects the central processing unit, RAM, motherboard chip-set, and other hardware features of a modern personal computer or Android device.

Features 
CPU-Z is more comprehensive in virtually all areas compared to the tools provided in the Windows OS to identify various hardware components, and thus assists in identifying certain components without the need of opening the case; particularly the core revision and RAM clock rate. It also provides information on the system's GPU.

See also 
 CPUID
 Benchmark (computing)
 GPU-Z
 Speccy

External links 
 CPU-Z official website
 CNET Editors' review (December 2009)
 Softpedia review (October 2006)
 BenchmarkHQ review (2001)

Windows-only freeware
Portable software
Utilities for Windows
Android (operating system) software
System administration
2001 software